The 2018–19 Hazfi Cup was the 32nd season of the Iranian football knockout competition.

The final played at the Foolad Arena in Ahvaz on 2 June 2019 between Damash Gilan and Persepolis which Persepolis won the match 1–0 and won its second double after 20 years.

Participating teams
A total of 62 teams participated in the 2018–19 Hazfi Cup. The teams were divided into three main groups.

16 teams of the Persian Gulf Pro League:

16 teams of Azadegan League:

First stage

First round

Second round

Third round

Second stage

Fourth round (round of 32) 
The 16 teams from Iran Pro League entered the competition from the second stage.

Fifth round (round of 16)

Sixth round (quarter-final)

Seventh round (semi-final)

Eighth round (final)

Bracket 
The following is the bracket which the Hazfi Cup resembled.

See also 
 Iran Pro League 2018–19
 Azadegan League 2018–19
 Iran Football's 2nd Division 2018–19
 Iran Football's 3rd Division 2018–19
 Iranian Super Cup

References

Hazfi Cup seasons
Hazfi Cup
Hazfi Cup